Great Hockham is a village in the English county of Norfolk within the civil parish of Hockham, though the distinction between village and parish may now be moot as there is evidence to suggest that the other village in the parish, Little Hockham, consists only of a farmhouse.

 
It is served by Holy Trinity church in the Benefice of Wayland Group.

Notable residents
 The crime novelist Christopher Bush (1885-1973), who also wrote six novels about Breckland life under the pen name Michael Home, was born in Great Hockham.

References

Villages in Norfolk
Breckland District